Pene galilaea is a species of air-breathing land snail, a terrestrial pulmonate gastropod mollusk in the family Enidae.

This species is endemic to Israel.

References

Enidae
Gastropods described in 1972
Taxonomy articles created by Polbot